Kop Tong is an upland Hakka village in the North District, in the northeastern part of the New Territories of Hong Kong.

Administration
Kop Tong is a recognized village under the New Territories Small House Policy.

History
Kop Tong is over 300 years old. It is one of the seven Hakka villages of the Hing Chun Yeuk, which comprises Kop Tong, Lai Chi Wo, Mui Tsz Lam, Ngau Shi Wu, Sam A Village, Siu Tan, and So Lo Pun.

The village has been the focus of conservation and revitalization projects in the early 2020s.

Flora and fauna
The villages of Mui Tsz Lam and Kop Tong are surrounded by dense woodland. The stream system at Lai Chi Wo, Mui Tsz Lam and Kop Tong provides habitats for three amphibian species of conservation concern: Chinese Bullfrog Hoplobatrachus chinensis, Big-headed Frog Limnonectes fujianensis and Lesser Spiny Frog Paa exilispinosa. The fung shui woodlands at Mui Tsz Lam and
Kop Tong support a diversity of plans, including Pavetta hongkongensis and Aquilaria sinensis of conservation significance.

References

External links
 Delineation of area of existing village Kap Tong (Sha Tau Kok) for election of resident representative (2019 to 2022)

Villages in North District, Hong Kong
Sha Tau Kok